Mirditë District was one of the 36 districts of Albania, which were dissolved in July 2000 and replaced by 12 newly created counties. It is in the north of the country, and its capital was the town of Rrëshen. The district was located within the wider region of Mirdita, whose territory is synonymous with the historic Albanian tribe of the same name.

Administrative divisions
The district consisted of the following municipalities:
Fan
Kaçinar
Kthellë
Orosh
Rrëshen
Rubik
Selitë

Note: - urban municipalities in bold

Gallery

See also
 Republic of Mirdita
 Mirditë (municipality), municipality in Lezhë County
 Mirdita, region

References

External links
Mirdita Tourism Portal

Districts of Albania
Geography of Lezhë County
Albanian ethnographic regions
Mirditë